Ladnu, also Ladnun, is a city and a municipality, nearby Nagaur city in Nagaur district in the Indian state of Rajasthan. It is a Tehsil headquarters of Nagaur district. This city is famous as the birthplace of sacred Jain Aacharya Tulsi. It is the city of Jain temples and one of the most visited pilgrim places of Jain community after Shri Mahaveer ji. Ladnun is also home to the Jain Vishva Bharati University, several Jain temples with extensive marble work, Ramanand gaushala and other old temples of religious and architectural importance. Places within 15–20 km of Ladnun include Tal chhapar, Dungar Balaji, Salasar Balaji Dham, Tirupati Balaji at Sujangarh,Bhairav Baba Mandir at Bader village. 
Ladnun is also famous for cotton sarees.

Introduction 
Ladnun is a town and a municipality in Nagaur district in the Indian state of Rajasthan. It is also the 
tehsil's headquarters and subdivision. Ladnun tehsil has [139 village] in all. Nimbi Jodha, Jaswantgarh and Sunari are the largest of the villages and have 32 sarpanch  and more than 100 panch, Ladnun has a M.L.A seat under Rajasthan
Vidhan Sabha and it comes under Nagaur Lok Sabha seat. Ladnun has 32 elected ward members
in Ladnun Municipality. It also has one Panchayat Samiti, Tehsil and sub-division offices, one S.D.M. (CJ) Court and a stadium.
Ladnun was earlier known as Chanderi Nagari, It is 380 km
west of Delhi and 225 km north-west of Jaipur. Its population is approx. 57,047 as of 2001 Indian
census. It is situated 329 m above sea level and at 27° 39' 0" north and 74° 23'-1" east longitude.
The city is known for its spiritual tourist spots.

History 
The history of Ladnun finds 3000 BC, mention even in the Mahabharata by the name of Gandharv Vana under Ashram of Acharya Bhardwaja, among 1440 Villages given by his Gandharv pupils to him. Acharya Ashram was near black mountain (काला डूंगर) nowadays Chadwas. After Mahabharat this was under control of Nakul and Sahadeva. After then conquered by Chandel, Panwar, Dahelia Rajput dynasty lineage of Shishupala. Chandel built fort, palace and Chandra bawadi(step-well). Due to popularity of these rulers city was known by the name of Chandeli or old Chanderi. In 270 BC under Maurya kingdom, king Ashoka built a Budha Matha near fort, ruins can be seen in walls of Ladnun Garh. In 232 BC Samprati, grandson of Ashoka built a grand Jain temple; ruins of this temple are safe in Digambara Jain Greater temple. 

In 65–73 AD Chanderi was conquered by Sindh ruler and chandel king Veerpala was killed in this war. After eight years united Chandels in 73 AD again conquered. 117 AD under rule Chandel king Mahipatipal was famous by the name of Mahipatipur, was attacked by Bangdi Rajput of Nagaur and 600 chandel were killed in war. 574 AD Chauhan king Rana Mohil united army and attacked and conquered Mahipatipur, Bangdi Rajput run-away. Control of 1440 village remain under mohils since. 895 AD Mohil king Sahanpal repaired the garh, Pandit Lado ji Pareek's daughter Lada was sacrificed on foundation stone since then Mahipatipur was known by the name of Ladnun. 953 Being mentioned on the wall of Ladnun Fort  'पदमज दुहित्रक सुव'  it might possible Ladnun to be under control of Naga Dynasty of Shishupala.1377–1343, According to Jodhpur Ki Khyat, there was a war in 1377 between Ladnun ruler Mohils and rajput Viram, all relative of Viram was Killed near Kanpur village, Stone Statues of these Sankhla warrior's are still witness of this war in Khanpur.1475 Roa Jodha, Rao Bika and Rao Bida'a joint army defeated joint army of Ladnun ruler Bairsal, Hisar subedar Saran Khan and Bahlol Lodi of Delhi thus Ladnun became part of Jodhpur state.1483 Now Ladnun was safe under Jodhpur Control, Mohil Sardar Rao Jai Singh was popular administrator and he take keen interest in public welfare, he provide 1500 bigha land for farming and 12 bigha for residence to poet Sommar son of poet Jassudan Charan in 1483, Charan family still have copper-plates of this concern. In 1532 AD king of Jodhpur, Maldeo Rathore, annexed Ladnun and ruled. In 1783, the Talpurs, led by Mir Fateh Ali Khan Talpur attack on Sindh and Amarkot, supported by Delhi sultanate. Ladnun Thakur Shiv Dan Singh stood with Sodha of Amarkot, played a great role fighting with bravely, he died with his troops in war. War memorial Chhatris tells us valor of these warriors, situated outside Rao Gate.1807 Thakur Mangal Singh was popular for throwing 35 Seer spear by one hand. He killed dacoit Tara Chandawat with horse, near Naranya Pond, in single attempt. He developed Ladnun with straight stripes,  these are called Patiyan. before the merger of the states Ladnun was a part of erstwhile Jodhpur state.

Adinath Digambara Jain Temple

The town contains a place sacred to Jainism. The ancient Digambara Bara Jain Temple, situated in the heart of the city, had the idol of the deity Saraswati, one of the finest of that time. It has the inscription of the year 1229 AD. It has a number of temple houses, several artistic and rare idols of Tirthankaras, engraved pillars, rare pieces of art and old Jain manuscripts. The main temple, situated within it, is 10 feet deep inside the Earth and in its lowest floor there is an idol of Shantinath. On the crown of the Lord Shantinath, an inscription clearly indicates that the temple is built on Aashaadha Sukla 8,  Samvat 1136. This shows that the temple is more than 1000 years old. In the second vedica chamber, there is an idol of the second Tirthankara, Ajitnath. This idol is 74×60 cm in dimension and made of marble. An inscription on the idol is found of Baisak Sukla 13, Sanwat 1209. In front of Bhagwan Ajitnathji idol there is also a marble door with two pillars. The two pillars are decorated with artistic jaina images. In art gallery there are 166 marble an idol of Rishabha made of brown dtone, and two idols of bhagwan Parshvanath with nine headed serpents. An image of Neminath is also found in art fallery. Several other images made of metals are found in digging in the nearby areas of Ladnun are placed in this art gallery. 
In 232 BC Samprati, grandson of Ashoka built a grand Jain temple, ruins of this temple are safe in Digambara Jain Greater temple. Ladnun has also witnessed the valour of Great Amarkot (Rathore) who challenged the mighty Mughal Empire. The town of Ladnun in the district has gained its place on the map of the country being the headquarters of the Jain Vishva Bharati University which has become a centre of spiritual learnings and knowledge under the leadership of Acharya Tulsi, a great Jain saint, who has propagated the philosophy of "ANUVRAT" in order to enlighten people in this area of the country. Acharya Tulsi's birthplace was also Ladnun and he was awarded Indira Gandhi Award for National Integration in 1993–94.

Climate and rainfall 
Ladnun has a dry climate with a hot summer. Sand storms are common in summer. The climate of
the city is conspicuous by extreme dryness, large variations of temperature and highly variable
rainfall. The mercury in the Mercury Barometer keeps on rising intensely from March till June.
These are the hottest months. The maximum temperature recorded in the city is 47 °C with 0 °C as
the lowest recorded temperature. The average temperature of the city is 23.5 °C. The winter
season extends from mid November till the beginning of March. Rainy season is of a short duration
from July to mid September. The average rainfall in the city is 36.16 cm & 51.5% humidity.

Agricultural resources 
Agriculture is the main occupation of a majority of the population of the Ladnun tehsil.
Major crops:
Bajra, wheat, jowar, til, barley and pulses are the major crops of Ladnun. Rabi crops are usually
sown in November whereas Kharif crops are sown with the beginning of the first rains in July.

Geography
It has an average elevation of 328 metres (1079 feet).

Demographics 
 India census, Ladnu had a population of 57,047. Males constitute 51% of the population and females 49%. Ladnu has an average literacy rate of 60%, higher than the national average of 59.5%: male literacy is 71%, and female literacy is 49%. In Ladnu, 17% of the population is under 6 years of age.ladnun tehsil's biggest village is Nimbi jodha which is 15 km from ladnun

Holy Saint

Acharya Tulsi (20 October 1914 – 23 June 1997) was a Terapanthi Jain Acharya (an ascetic). He was the founder of the Anuvrata and the Jain Vishva Bharti Institute, Ladnun and the author of over one-hundred books. The son of devout Jain traders, Tulsi was born in 1914 in Ladnun, India to Jhumarmal Khater and Vadana Ji. Acharya Kalugani, the family guru, greatly influenced Tulsi, later recalling: "His divine face fascinated my heart and I used to gaze at him for hours."

Tulsi took his monk's vows at age 11 with remarkable dedication, and by the time he was 16, he had already started attracting acolytes. In 1936, Kalugani nominated Tulsi to be his successor, making him head of Terapanth group. Through his oversight, he initiated more than 776 monks and nuns.

Maharishi Kanishk Sharma took vows at the age of 6. He was the follower of Acharya Tulsi and had unparalleled knowledge in the field of Mathematics and Instrumentation.

Villages in Ladnun tehsil 
Please see – List of villages in Ladnu Tehsil

References

External links
 Rajasthantourism.gov.in destinations

Cities and towns in Nagaur district